The Laois All-County Football League (ACFL) is an annual Gaelic football competition contested by Laois GAA clubs. There are seven divisions and teams are promoted and relegated according to their league standing each year.

Prior to the inception of the All-County Football League, league competitions titled the Senior Football League, Intermediate Football League and Junior Football League were in place. These would have roughly equated to the current top three or four divisions in the ACFL.

The 2022 ACFL Division One winners were St Joseph's who defeated Graiguecullen in the final.

The trophy for ACFL Division One is called the Rexie McDonald Cup.

Roll of honour

Division One (formerly Senior Football League)

Division One "B"

Division Two (formerly Intermediate Football League)

Division Three (formerly Junior Football League)

Division Three "B"

Division Four

Division Five

External links
Latest Laois GAA News
Official Laois Website
Laois on Hoganstand
Laois Club GAA

Gaelic football competitions in County Laois
Gaelic football leagues in Ireland